Motor Torpedo Boat Squadron Three (MTBRon 3) was a United States Navy squadron based at Cavite, Philippines, from September 1941 to mid-April 1942. It was commanded by Lieutenant John D. Bulkeley and made up of six motor torpedo boats: PT-31, PT-32, PT-33, PT-34, PT-35, and PT-41, the last as the squadron flagship. The other six boats of the squadron remained at Pearl Harbor, Hawaii, and were there when war broke out, eventually being shipped to the Solomons.

History 
After the outbreak of hostilities between the United States and Japan on 7 December 1941, the squadron moved from Cavite to Sisiman Bay on the Bataan Peninsula with the requisitioned tug Trabajador as tender, where it helped in the defense of Bataan and Corregidor during the Japanese invasion of the Philippines. PT-31 and PT-33 were sunk during the battle. The desired practice was for boats to patrol in pairs in the event one PT needed assistance from another.
 
On 11 March 1942, the remaining boats of the squadron transported General Douglas MacArthur and several high-ranking officers from Corregidor to Mindanao, an act which earned every member of the squadron the Silver Star. PT-32 was scuttled during this mission, reducing the squadron to three boats: PT-41, PT-34, and PT-35.

This was to be the squadron's last action: PT-34 was destroyed by Japanese aircraft, PT-35 had to be scuttled to avoid capture, and PT-41 was commandeered by the U.S. Army to defend Lake Lanao. She was scuttled as well, three days after transfer.

Bulkeley and three other officers were later flown to safety on MacArthur's orders, with a fifth officer joining them shortly after. These five officers were all that remained of this squadron as a result. Three officers and fifteen enlisted men were killed in action or died as prisoners of war, seven evaded capture as guerrillas on Leyte, and 38 POWs were liberated after the war.

The squadron's exploits were immortalized in the book and film They Were Expendable. Bulkeley was awarded the Medal of Honor, the Distinguished Service Cross, the Philippine Distinguished Conduct Star, and the Silver Star during his command of the squadron, making him one of the most decorated U.S. naval officers of World War II.

They were commanded by Lcdr. Alan R. Montgomery. In late 1942 the Squadron shipped for Tulagi with six 77' Elco boats and six 80' Elco boats. They were the first PTs in the Solomons. Their exploits in The Slot are history. At the end of the Solomon's campaign MTBRon 3(2) was decommissioned. The Squadron was recommissioned in the Atlantic as MTBRON 2(2).

List of assigned boats 
 PT-31: commanded by LTJG E. G. DeLong. Grounded and scuttled at Subic Bay, Luzon, 20 January 1942.
 PT-32: commanded by LTJG V. E. Schumacher.
 PT-33: commanded by LTJG H. J. Brantingham. Grounded and scuttled at Subic Bay, 15 December 1941.
 PT-34: commanded by LT R. B. Kelly. Destroyed by air attack at Kawit Island, Mindanao, 9 April 1942.
 PT-35: commanded by ENS A. B. Akers. Burned to prevent capture at Cebu, Visayas Region, 12 April 1942.
 PT-41: commanded by LT J. D. Bulkeley. Squadron flagship. Burned to prevent capture near Lake Lanao, Mindanao, 15 April 1942.

Notes

References

Bibliography 

Ship squadrons of the United States Navy